Yves Boisset (born 14 March 1939) is a French film director and scriptwriter.

Boisset began his career as an assistant director. After working with such directors as Hossein, Ciampi, Melville and Clement, he began directing short films until the late 1960s when he made his feature film debut. Boisset frequently contributes to the scripts he shoots and is known for his fast-paced action-adventures and his social and political thrillers. His 1972 film L'Attentat entered into the 8th Moscow International Film Festival where it won the Silver Prize.

Filmography

As director

 1966: Rouletabille (episode "Le parfum de la dame en noir") (TV series)
 1968: Coplan Saves His Skin
 1970: Safety Catch
 1970: The Cop
 1971: 
 1972: Plot
 1973: 
 1975: 
 1975: The Common Man
 1977: The Purple Taxi
 1977: Le Juge Fayard dit Le Shériff
 1978: 
 1979: Histoires insolites (épisode "La stratégie du serpent") (TV)
 1980: The Woman Cop
 1981: 
 1982: Espion, lève-toi
 1983: Le Prix du Danger
 1984: Dog Day
 1986: 
 1987: La Fée carabine (TV)
 1988: Médecins des hommes (TV series)
 1988: 
 1989: Le Suspect (TV)
 1989: 
 1990: Frontière du crime (Double Identity) (TV)
 1991: Les Carnassiers (TV)
 1991: 
 1993:  (TV)
 1993: Chute libre (TV)
 1994: : Der Tunnel (TV)
 1995:  (TV)
 1996: Les Amants de rivière rouge (TV series)
 1997: La Fine équipe (TV)
 1997: Une leçon particulière (TV)
 1997:  (TV)
 1999: Sam (TV)
 2001: Les Redoutables (episode Poisson d'avril) (TV series)
 2001: Dormir avec le diable (TV)
 2001:  (TV)
 2002:  (TV)
 2005: Ils veulent cloner le Christ (TV)
 2006: Les Mystères sanglants de l'OTS (TV)
 2007: La Bataille d'Alger (TV)
 2009:  (TV)

References

External links

1939 births
Living people
French male screenwriters
French screenwriters
Film directors from Paris